Bell Township may refer to:

 Bell Township, Reno County, Kansas, in Reno County, Kansas
 Bell Township, Rice County, Kansas, in Rice County, Kansas
 Bell Township, Cass County, North Dakota, in Cass County, North Dakota
 Bell Township, Clearfield County, Pennsylvania
 Bell Township, Jefferson County, Pennsylvania
 Bell Township, Westmoreland County, Pennsylvania

Township name disambiguation pages